Dietmar Meinel is a German cross-country skier. He began his career for the SC Dynamo Klingenthal / Sportvereinigung (SV) Dynamo. He won a gold medal at the world championships for Dynamo.

References 

German cross-country skiers
Living people
Year of birth missing (living people)
20th-century German people